Juston Wood (born December 27, 1979) is an American football coach and former quarterback who is currently an offensive analyst at Arizona State University. He played three seasons in the Arena Football League with the New York Dragons and Philadelphia Soul. He played college football at Portland State. He was also a member of the Minnesota Vikings and Central Valley Coyotes.

Early years
Wood played high school football and was a three-year varsity letter winner at David Douglas High School in Portland, Oregon. He also earned all-conference honors in basketball.

College career
Wood played for the Portland State Vikings of Portland State University from 1999 to 2002. He twice earned ADA Academic All-American honors. He was a first-team All-Big Sky Conference selection at quarterback in 2001 and honorable mention in 2002, serving as team captain both seasons. He recorded career passing totals of 414 completions, 724 incompletions, 37 touchdowns and 5,653 yards. He graduated from Portland State with a bachelor's degree in public health education.

Professional career
He was rated the 14th best quarterback in the 2003 NFL Draft by NFLDraftScout.com.

Wood signed with the Minnesota Vikings on April 28, 2003. He was released by the Vikings on August 25, 2003.

Wood played for the Central Valley Coyotes of the af2 from 2004 to 2005. He completed 60 of 105 passes for 651 yards and 15 scores in 2004. He earned second-team All-National Conference honors, led af2 in total offense averaging 282.4 yards per game and passed for 4,361 yards and 89 touchdowns in 2005.

Wood joined the New York Dragons on January 14, 2006. He was released by the Dragons October 24, 2006. He was signed by the Philadelphia Soul on November 27, 2006. Wood signed with the New York Dragons on March 7, 2008.

AFL statistics

Stats from ArenaFan:

Coaching career
Wood was an assistant coach at David Douglas High School. He became wide receivers coach of the Cal Poly Mustangs of California Polytechnic State University in 2009. He switched to quarterbacks coach in 2013 and became offensive coordinator of the Mustangs in 2016. In December 2016, he was named the wide receivers coach for the Georgia Southern Eagles of Georgia Southern University.

References

External links
Just Sports Stats
Juston Wood trading card

Living people
1979 births
American football quarterbacks
David Douglas High School alumni
Portland State Vikings football players
Minnesota Vikings players
Central Valley Coyotes players
New York Dragons players
Philadelphia Soul players
High school football coaches in Oregon
Cal Poly Mustangs football coaches
Georgia Southern Eagles football coaches
Players of American football from Portland, Oregon
Sportspeople from Portland, Oregon